Rhinodoras gallagheri is a species of thorny catfish known from Apure River, Capanaparo River, and Arauca River, all left bank tributaries of the middle Orinoco, in the llanos regions of Apure and Barinas States of Venezuela. It is also known from the Aguas de Limon River in the Arauca Department of Colombia.  This species grows to a length of  SL.

References 
 

Doradidae
Freshwater fish of Colombia
Fish of Venezuela
Fish described in 2008